Desoxycorticosterone acetate (also known as DOCA and 11-deoxycorticosterone 21-acetate and sold under the brand names Percorten Acetate and Decosterone, among others) is a mineralocorticoid medication and a mineralocorticoid ester. It is formulated as an oil solution and is administered once daily by intramuscular injection. The medication is the C21 acetate ester of 11-deoxycorticosterone.

References

Acetate esters
Corticosteroid esters
Diketones
Mineralocorticoids
Pregnanes
Prodrugs
Progestogens